Cantonment English School and College is an educational institution located in Chittagong Cantonment, Bangladesh, near Chittagong Cantonment Public College.

History 
Originally known as Cantonment International School, the institution was founded in 1998. In 2005, it redefined itself as Cantonment English School. The school evolved to offer the Higher Secondary Certificate level in 2010 and, as a result, renamed itself to Cantonment English School and College.

Extra-curricular activities 
The institution has an annual sports competition with seventy-seven events.

In 2018, the school participated in the 59th International Mathematical Olympiad in Romania. In the team event, they came in forty-first place. Zawad Chowdhury, a student of the school, won a gold medal in 2018; it was the first gold medal for Bangladesh.

See also
 Army Medical College, Chittagong

References

Schools in Chittagong
Educational institutions established in 1998
1998 establishments in Bangladesh
Educational Institutions affiliated with Bangladesh Army